Heroz4Hire is the third studio album by hip hop artist Jeru the Damaja. It is entirely produced by Jeru the Damaja himself unlike his first two albums which were produced by DJ Premier.

Album information
This album lacked the critical acclaim of Jeru's first two albums. It also did not chart, or have any charting singles.

The album features Miz Marvel and Lil' Dap (of Group Home) as guests. Afu-Ra is not featured, as on Jeru's previous albums.

Miz Marvel, a member of Jeru's Supahuman Klik and Knowsavage record label, appears on four tracks.

Reception

John Bush of Allmusic enjoys the production claiming that it is similar to Premier's work in its rawness, but there are not as many catchy hooks.

Q magazine (6/00, p. 108) - 3 stars out of 5 - "Creative and coherent...the lyrics are intelligent, and the record benefits from contributions by the very talented Mizmarvel."

The Wire (5/00, p. 53) - "Harks back to a primordial age of HipHop basics, and there's no question that he's got the lyrical flow and gaunt studio talent to pull it off....boldly speaking of purity and survival."

Track listing
All songs written and produced by Jeru the Damaja

Album singles

References

1999 albums
Jeru the Damaja albums